Tulisi is an ethnic group in Sudan. They speak kutulisi a Kathu language. The population of this group is at several 1,000.

References
Joshua Project

Nuba peoples
Ethnic groups in Sudan